Columbus Southwest Airport  is a privately owned, public use airport located 11 nautical miles (13 mi, 20 km) southwest of the central business district of Columbus, in Franklin County, Ohio, United States.

Facilities and aircraft 
Columbus Southwest Airport covers an area of 14 acres (6 ha) at an elevation of 920 feet (280 m) above mean sea level. It has one runway designated 6/24 with a turf surface measuring 2,382 by 120 feet (726 x 37 m).

For the 12-month period ending July 26, 2010, the airport had 11,833 general aviation aircraft operations, an average of 32 per day. At that time there were 16 aircraft based at this airport, all single-engine.

References

External links 
 Aerial image as of March 1995 from USGS The National Map

Defunct airports in Ohio
Airports in Ohio
Transportation buildings and structures in Franklin County, Ohio